Ciara Smith (born 9 December 2000) is a New Zealand swimmer. She competed in the women's 100 metre breaststroke event at the 2018 FINA World Swimming Championships (25 m), in Hangzhou, China.

References

2000 births
Living people
New Zealand female swimmers
Female breaststroke swimmers
Place of birth missing (living people)